Wheatland Township is an inactive township in Hickory County, in the U.S. state of Missouri.

Wheatland Township was established in 1881, taking its name from the community of Wheatland, Missouri.

References

Townships in Missouri
Townships in Hickory County, Missouri